Boaro is a surname. Notable people with the surname include:

Édson Boaro (born 1959), Brazilian footballer
Manuele Boaro (born 1987), Italian cyclist